Laila Peak is a major prominence at the southwestern terminus of the Rupal Valley in Pakistan. To its north lies the Rupal Glacier and to its east lies  Rupal Peak. To the north of the Rupal Glacier stands the Nanga Parbat massif, one of largest in the world. About its flanks stand numerous notable peaks including Rakhiot Peak, Chongra Peak, Shaigiri and Mazeno Peak.

See also
 Highest Mountains of the World

Sources
Coordinates located using maps in Pakistan Trekking Guide, by Isobel and Ben Shaw, printed 1993.

External links
 German expedition to Laila Peak, Rupal Valley

Five-thousanders of the Himalayas
Mountains of Gilgit-Baltistan
Astore District